Mary Hackett "Topo" Swope (born February 14, 1949) is an American actress and talent agent. She is the daughter of actress Dorothy McGuire and still photographer John Swope.

Early life and family
Mary Hackett Swope was born on February 14, 1949, in New York City to photographer John Swope and film actress Dorothy McGuire.

Film career
Swope acted in several films in the 1970s. She had a supporting role in the Peter Yates film  The Hot Rock (1972) in which she appeared with Robert Redford and George Segal.

Topo Swope Gallery
Following her film career, Swope opened an art gallery in Los Angeles. In September 1981 she mounted the first-ever exhibition of paintings by Henry Fonda, an old family friend. While the original paintings were not for sale, 200 signed lithographs were available for $500 apiece.

Talent agent
In 1994 she founded Topo Swope Talent.

Filmography
 My Old Man's Place (1971)
 Pretty Maids All in a Row (1971)
 The Hot Rock (1972)	
 Tracks (1977)
 Hot Rod
(1979)| 1979 || Starsky & Hutch || Arlene|| 1 episode (S04 E21)
 The Little Dragons (1980)

References

External links
 

1948 births
Living people
American film actresses
Businesspeople from New York City
American talent agents
21st-century American women